Paraselkirkia is a genus of archaeopriapulid known from the Chengjiang biota, resembling Selkirkia.

References

Prehistoric protostome genera
Priapulida

Cambrian genus extinctions